Bryce Moon (born 6 April 1986 in Pietermaritzburg, KwaZulu-Natal) is a South African football player who last played for Maritzburg United as a defender and midfielder.

An attacking right-back and a decent crosser of the ball, Moon is nicknamed "Scooter" for his blistering pace.

International career
He made his national team debut for South Africa in a 1–0 win against Botswana on 29 September 2007 and has so far been capped 17 times, scoring one goal.

Moon was also part of South Africa's squad at the 2008 Africa Cup of Nations and the 2009 FIFA Confederations Cup.

International Goals

Honours

Club
 ABSA Cup 2007

Fatal car crash, 2009
On 30 June 2009, Moon struck and killed a 25-year-old female pedestrian from Tembisa while driving in Sandton, Johannesburg. He sustained minor injuries and faced culpable homicide charges. The charges were dropped in April 2010 but were reinstated in January 2011.

On 12 April 2013 he was found guilty of culpable homicide in the Randburg Magistrate's Court. Magistrate Vincent Pienaar said Moon's version that he was not speeding at the time of the accident is false.
He said Bryce Moon had no regard for his victim's life. He was acquitted of murder, attempted murder, drunk driving and reckless driving.

References

External links

1986 births
Living people
South African soccer players
South Africa international soccer players
South African expatriate soccer players
Sportspeople from Pietermaritzburg
Cape Town Spurs F.C. players
Panathinaikos F.C. players
Association football midfielders
Association football defenders
Super League Greece players
Cape Coloureds
Coleraine F.C. players
2009 FIFA Confederations Cup players
2008 Africa Cup of Nations players
PAOK FC players
SuperSport United F.C. players
Expatriate footballers in Greece
Bidvest Wits F.C. players
Mamelodi Sundowns F.C. players
South Africa A' international soccer players
2014 African Nations Championship players
South African expatriate sportspeople in Greece